Jocara terrenalis is a species of snout moth in the genus Jocara. It is found in Costa Rica.

References

Moths described in 1912
Jocara